Lucius Whitney Watkins (August 6, 1873September 17, 1950) was a Michigan politician.

Early life
Watkins was born in Norvell Township, Michigan on August 6, 1873 to parents 	
Lucius Denison and Sarah Tinkler Watkins.

Career
Watkins was a member of Michigan state board of agriculture from 1899 to 1905. Watkins was elected to the Michigan Senate on November 3, 1908. He served from January 6, 1909 to 1912. Watkins was a delegate to Republican National Convention from Michigan in 1912. Watkins was the Progressive nominee in the 1912 Michigan gubernatorial election. Watkins was a member of the Michigan state board of agriculture again from 1920 to 1927.

Personal life
Watkins married Grace Edith Alley in 1899. Watkins was a member of the Audubon Society and the Michigan Farm Bureau.

Death
Watkins died on September 17, 1950. He was interred at Oak Grove Cemetery in Manchester, Michigan.

References

1873 births
1950 deaths
Michigan Progressives (1912)
Republican Party Michigan state senators
Burials in Michigan
19th-century American politicians
20th-century American politicians